Mary Moraa (born 15 June 2000) is a Kenyan athlete who specialises in the 800 metres. She won the bronze medal in the event at the 2022 World Athletics Championships and a gold at the 2022 Commonwealth Games.

Moraa holds Kenyan record in the 400 metres. She was the 2022 Diamond League 800 m champion.

Career
Mary Moraa specialized in the 400 metres distance until 2021. She made her international debut in 2017 by winning silver in the event with a personal best at the IAAF World U18 Championships in Nairobi. The following year, the 18-year-old placed fifth at the IAAF World U20 Championships held in Tampere, Finland.

In 2019, she won the African U20 title, Kenyan senior title, and placed fourth at the African Games held in Rabat, Morocco. She represented Kenya without success at the World Championships in Doha competing in the 400 m and mixed 4 × 400 m relay events.

Moraa transitioned to the 800 metres in 2021, and represented Kenya at the delayed 2020 Tokyo Olympics competing in the event, where she was eliminated in the semi-finals with a time of 2:00.47.

In July 2022, Moraa took the bronze medal in the 800 metres at the World Championships in Eugene, Oregon, clocking a personal best of 1:56.71 behind Athing Mu (1:56.30) and Keely Hodgkinson (1:56.38). The following month, she won a gold in the event at the Birmingham Commonwealth Games after storming through to beat Hodgkinson in the final. She went from first to last and back to first in that race. In September, Moraa became the Diamond League champion over the 800 m after she won final in Zürich.

Achievements

International competitions

Personal bests
 400 metres – 50.67 (Brussels 2022) 
 800 metres – 1:56.71 (Eugene, OR 2022)
 800 metres indoor – 2:00.61 (Liévin 2023)

Circuit wins and titles, National championships
 Diamond League champion 800 m:  2022
 2022 (800 m): Stockholm Bauhaus-galan, Zürich Weltklasse
 Kenyan Athletics Championships
 400 metres: 2019

References

External links

2000 births
Living people
Kenyan female sprinters
Place of birth missing (living people)
World Athletics Championships athletes for Kenya
Athletes (track and field) at the 2019 African Games
African Games competitors for Kenya
Athletes (track and field) at the 2020 Summer Olympics
Olympic athletes of Kenya
World Athletics Championships medalists
Commonwealth Games gold medallists for Kenya
Commonwealth Games medallists in athletics
Athletes (track and field) at the 2022 Commonwealth Games
21st-century Kenyan women
Medallists at the 2022 Commonwealth Games